William, Bill or Billy Byrne may refer to:

 William Byrne (boxer), former boxer from New Zealand
 William Byrne (Catholic) (1780–1833), Irish missionary and educator
 William Byrne (engraver) (1743–1805), British artist
 William Byrne (painter) (1906–1997), American painter
 William Byrne (priest), Irish priest
 William A. Byrne (1872–1933), Irish poet and educator
 William D. Byrne Jr., United States Navy admiral
 William Draper Byrne (born 1964), Roman Catholic bishop of Springfield, Massachusetts, United States
 William Henry Byrne (1844–1917), Irish architect
 William Matthew Byrne Sr. (1896–1974), American judge
 William Matthew Byrne Jr. (1930–2006), American judge, and son of William Matthew Byrne Sr
 William Michael Byrne (1775–1798), Irish revolutionary
 William Patrick Byrne (1859–1935), member of the British Civil Service
 William Pitt Byrne (1806–1861), British newspaper editor and proprietor of The Morning Post
 William T. Byrne (1876–1952), American politician in New York
 Bill Byrne (athletic director), American collegiate athletic director
 Bill Byrne (footballer, born 1896) (1896–1930), Australian footballer for Fitzroy
 Bill Byrne (footballer, born 1931) (1931–2020), Australian footballer for Melbourne
 Bill Byrne (politician) (born 1958), Member of the Queensland Parliament
 Bill Byrne (sports entrepreneur)  (1936–2007), founder of the first women's professional basketball league
 Billy Byrne (footballer) (1918–2001), English footballer
 Billy Byrne (hurler) (born 1960), Irish retired hurler

See also
 William O'Byrne (1908–1951), English cricketer
 William Richard O'Byrne (1823–1896), Irish biographer and politician
 William Burn (disambiguation)
 William Burns (disambiguation)